Paadha Kaanikkai is a 1962 Tamil-language drama film directed by K. Shankar and written by M. S. Solamalai. The film stars Gemini Ganesan and Savitri, with C. R. Vijayakumari, M. R. Radha and Kamal Haasan in supporting roles. It was released on 14 July 1962.

Cast 
Gemini Ganesan as Sekar
Savitri as Malathi
C. R. Vijayakumari as Chitra
M. R. Radha as Veerasamy Pillai
J. P. Chandrababu as Veerasamy Pillai's son
Kamal Haasan as Ravi
S. V. Subbaiah as Sekar's father
S. A. Ashokan as Manickam
M. V. Rajamma as Parvathi
C. K. Saraswathi as Eshwari
Karikol Raju as Villager
S. Rama Rao as Pardeshi
D. Balasubramaniam
Padmini Priyadarshini
K. R. Indira Devi

Production 
Paadha Kaanikkai was produced by G. N. Velumani, directed and edited by K. Shankar, written by M. S. Solamalai.

Soundtrack 
The music was composed by Viswanathan–Ramamoorthy, with lyrics by Kannadasan.

Release and reception 
Paadha Kaanikkai was released on 14 July 1962. The Indian Express stated on 10 August, "In Saravana Films' [Paatha Kaanikai] ... one gets to know what boredom is ... A meaning or purpose is difficult to deduce from this shoddy yarn." The reviewer noted that the characters were "poorly drawn" and criticised the direction by K. Shankar, but noted that the actors "make the best of a bad job". Kalki negatively reviewed the film, but praised the performances of certain actors.  According to historian Randor Guy, the film failed commercially, mainly due to "its predictable storyline and theatrical look."

References

External links 
 

1960s Tamil-language films
1962 drama films
1962 films
Films directed by K. Shankar
Films scored by Viswanathan–Ramamoorthy
Indian black-and-white films
Indian drama films